Retro Studios, Inc. is an American video game developer and subsidiary of Nintendo based in Austin, Texas. The studio is best known for its work on the Metroid Prime and Donkey Kong Country series, and has contributed to several other Nintendo-developed projects, such as Mario Kart 7.

Retro was founded on September 21, 1998, as an alliance between Nintendo and Iguana Entertainment founder Jeff Spangenberg, hoping to create games for the upcoming GameCube aiming at an older demographic. The company began work on four games, all of which were canceled once Retro focused their resources on Metroid Prime, the first Metroid game developed outside Japan. The success of Metroid Prime led Retro to work on three sequels, and later to become involved with reviving the Donkey Kong series with Donkey Kong Country Returns.

History

1998–2002: Founding and Metroid Prime

Retro Studios was founded on September 21, 1998, as an alliance between Nintendo and industry veteran Jeff Spangenberg. Spangenberg subsequently launched the company from his home on October 1, using funds he generated with his previous ventures, including Iguana Entertainment. Nintendo saw an opportunity for the new studio to create games for the upcoming GameCube targeting an older demographic, in the same vein as Iguana Entertainment's successful Turok series for the Nintendo 64. Retro began with 4 key people in late 1998 and opened an office in Austin, Texas in early 1999 with a staff of 25 people, including several former Iguana employees. Despite not having access to GameCube development kits, the studio immediately began work on four projects for the GameCube: an action adventure game named MetaForce, a vehicular combat game with the working title Car Combat (also known as Thunder Rally), an American football simulator named NFL Retro Football, and role-playing game Raven Blade. By the time development began, the studio had already grown in size to 120 employees. The company continued to grow during production, eventually peaking at over 200 employees.

The working environment was chaotic, with development getting behind schedule, and Nintendo executives complaining on how the games turned out. In 2000, producer Shigeru Miyamoto visited the studio. He was disappointed by the games except for their demonstration of the MetaForce game engine, which led Miyamoto to suggest that Retro could use the engine to develop a new game in the Metroid series. Shortly before the 2000 Nintendo Space World conference, Nintendo granted Retro the license to create Metroid Prime, and Retro shifted all development resources from MetaForce to the new game.

Retro eventually canceled development of their other projects to focus solely on Metroid Prime. In February 2001, the company ended development of both NFL Retro Football and Thunder Rally, laying off about 20 employees. Although Retro demonstrated Raven Blade at E3 in 2001, the development team was plagued by technical setbacks. In July 2001, Retro canceled the project, retaining only nine team members to work on Metroid Prime. Notably, artist Android Jones served as lead concept artist on the development of Metroid Prime.

On May 2, 2002, Nintendo secured $1 million worth of Retro Studios stock from Spangenberg, and reclassified the company as a first party developer and division of Nintendo. Steve Barcia, the founder of Simtex, replaced Spangenberg as president of the company.

During the final nine months of Metroid Prime'''s development, Retro's staff worked 80- to 100-hour weeks to reach their final milestone. Despite its troubled production cycle and initial skepticism from fans, the game was released on November 17, 2002, in North America to universal critical acclaim and commercial success, selling over two million units worldwide.

2003–2009: The Metroid Prime trilogy

After the critical and commercial success of Metroid Prime, Nintendo asked Retro Studios to produce a sequel. The developers decided against recycling the features of the first game while creating Metroid Prime 2: Echoes, and instead used new sound models, weapon effects, and art designs. A multiplayer component was also added to the game. In April 2003, Steve Barcia left the company. Michael Kelbaugh, who had worked with Nintendo for over 15 years, was appointed president, a job he retains to this date. Retro tried to include some extras, such as a hidden version of Super Metroid, but were halted by the short development time. Producer Kensuke Tanabe later revealed in an interview that the game was just about thirty percent complete three months before the strict deadline Nintendo had set for a release in the 2004 holiday season. The critical reception for Metroid Prime 2: Echoes was very positive, but earned some criticism on the game's high difficulty. Sales for Echoes were lower than the first Prime, with a total of 800,000 units.

Retro Studios was then put to produce the next game in the Metroid Prime series, Metroid Prime 3: Corruption. Retro intended to give Metroid Prime 3: Corruption larger environments than Echoes. The developers were also interested in using the WiiConnect24 feature to provide additional content for the game that would be accessible from the Internet. Retro announced that Corruption would be the final chapter of the Prime series and would have a plot "about closure, told against the backdrop of an epic struggle". After the Wii Remote was revealed, Nintendo demonstrated how Metroid Prime 3 would take advantage of the controller's special abilities with a version of Echoes modified for the Wii and shown at the Tokyo Game Show in 2005. Originally envisioned as a launch game for the Wii in November 2006, Corruption suffered many delays, but eventually being released in August 2007 generally positive reviews, and over 1.60 million copies sold worldwide.

While Retro was busy with the Prime sequels, they had to pass on the Nintendo DS game Metroid Prime Hunters. The eventual developer, Nintendo Software Technology (NST), worked closely with Retro to design the game's art and characters to make sure that they fit into the overall Metroid series.

2010–present: Donkey Kong Country series, Metroid Prime 4, and other projects

In April 2008, Retro saw the departure of three key developers, designer Mark Pacini, art director Todd Keller, and principal technology engineer Jack Mathews, who went on to form their own company, Armature Studio. Around the same time, Shigeru Miyamoto asked fellow producer Kensuke Tanabe to recommend a studio that could develop a new Donkey Kong game, and Tanabe recommended Retro. Kelbaugh had worked on the Donkey Kong Country series during his years at Nintendo of America, and had interest in continuing with the franchise. Retro accepted the task, and thus started development of Donkey Kong Country Returns. Similar to New Super Mario Bros., the game was developed with the intention to invoke nostalgic feelings in the player with its art style and sound, while trying to provide them with new gameplay experiences. Returns employs fully polygonal 3D graphics with three times the amount of textures and polygons that Corruption offered, and over the course of six months, two thirds of the game's tools and engine had to be rewritten by the programmers. Development accelerated at the outset of 2010, and the project was just "beginning to cohere as a game" around the time of E3, when it was officially announced to the press. Although the game was set for release in autumn that year, the team still had 70 levels to create or refine.

At E3 2011, it was announced during Nintendo's Developer Roundtable that Retro Studios would be involved in the development of Mario Kart 7 for Nintendo 3DS. At first, Retro would contribute assets to developing one of the Donkey Kong-themed levels, but the number evolved to the stage design of sixteen tracks in the late stages of development, as the Nintendo EAD crew started working on other projects and the game would not be finished before the December 2011 deadline.

In 2012, it was revealed that Retro Studios had received a Wii U development kit, and was reportedly working on a Wii U game. Miyamoto has said he would like to work with Retro Studios in an installment for The Legend of Zelda; however, he says that the current game Retro Studios was working on is not related to Zelda. At E3 2012, Nintendo of America president Reggie Fils-Aimé told IGN in an interview that Retro is currently "hard at work" on an untitled project for the Wii U.

On February 28, 2014, Kensuke Tanabe announced that Retro Studios was working on a new game, which CEO Michael Kelbaugh declared had been in development for a few months since Donkey Kong Country: Tropical Freeze was finished. In August 2015 however, during an interview about Metroid Prime: Federation Force, Tanabe said that he was not quite sure about what Retro Studios was working on, leaving the impression that he was no longer involved with their unannounced project.

Nintendo announced Metroid Prime 4 at E3 2017, showing only the logo. Shortly after the announcement, Bill Trinen, Director of Product Marketing at Nintendo of America, confirmed that Prime 4 would not be developed by Retro Studios, the studio that developed the previous Metroid Prime games, but would be produced by Kensuke Tanabe, the producer of the previous games. In 2018, Eurogamer reported that Prime 4 was being developed by Bandai Namco Studios in Singapore. However, in a video released on January 25, 2019, Nintendo EPD general manager Shinya Takahashi announced that Metroid Prime 4'' had been delayed, and that development had been restarted with Retro Studios. Takahashi said that development under the previous studio had not met Nintendo's standards. Nintendo's shares fell by 2.8 percent in the week following the announcement.

Games

Canceled

Notes

References

External links
 

 
1998 establishments in Texas
2002 mergers and acquisitions
American companies established in 1998
American subsidiaries of foreign companies
Companies based in Austin, Texas
First-party video game developers
Nintendo divisions and subsidiaries
Video game companies based in Texas
Video game companies established in 1998
Video game development companies